= Kapu Sens =

American literary review magazine

Kapu-Sens is a literary review published by the Africana Studies department California State University Northridge. It was started in 1969.
